Hydropectis is a genus of Mexican flowering plants in the family Asteraceae.

 Species
 Hydropectis aquatica (S.Wats.) Rydb. - Chihuahua, Durango
 Hydropectis estradii B.L.Turner - Chihuahua
 Hydropectis stevensii McVaugh - Jalisco, Guanajuato

References

Tageteae
Asteraceae genera
Endemic flora of Mexico